Skingen  is a small village in Waadhoeke in the province of Friesland, the Netherlands. It had a population of around 115 in January 2017.

History
The village was first mentioned around 1400 as Schengen, and is the name of a stream. Skingen developed at the beginning of our era on a natural height near the Middelzee. Archaeological artefacts have been discovered from the Roman period. Later the hill was extended into a terp (artificial living hill). A church had already been built in the 11th or 12th century when in 1877 work began on a new one. The church was restored in 2003.

Skingen was home to 109 people in 1840. Until 2018, the village was part of the Menameradiel municipality.

Born in Skingen
  (1945), Frisian writer

Gallery

References

Waadhoeke
Populated places in Friesland